The  was the currency of Japan from the Muromachi period in 1336 until the early Meiji period in 1870. It co-circulated with the new sen until 1891. Chinese wén, Korean mun, Vietnamese văn. Throughout Japanese history, there were many styles of currency of many shapes, styles, designs, sizes and materials, including gold, silver, bronze, etc. Coins denominated in mon were cast in copper or iron and circulated alongside silver and gold ingots denominated in shu, bu and ryō, with 4000 mon = 16 shu = 4 bu = 1 ryō. In 1869, due to depreciation against gold, the new fixing officially was set for 1 ryō/yen = 1,000 mon. The yen started to replace the old non-decimal denominations in 1870: in the 3rd quarter of 1870, the first new coins appeared, namely 5, 10, 50 sen silver and 2, 5, 10, 20 Yen. Smaller sen coins did not appear before spring, 1873. So the mon coins (1, 4, 100, 250 mon etc.) remained a necessity for ordinary peoples commodities and were allowed to circulate until 31st December 1891. From January 1, 1954, onward, the mon became invalid: postwar inflation had removed sen, mon etc. denominations smaller than 1 Yen. Due to the missing small coinage, the Japanese posts issued their first stamps (Meiji 4.3.1 / 1871.4.20) in mon and fixed postal rates in mon until April 1872 (Meiji 5.2.28).

During the co-existence of the mon with the sen between 1870 and 1891, the metal content of the old currency became important. Official exchange for coins from 1871.6.27: 4 copper mon = 2 rin, 1 bronze mon = 1 rin (1 rin = 1/10 of a sen). So while not all mon were valued equally, their metal kind counted after the transition to decimal sen: bronze was valued more highly than copper. The first physical rin denomination was introduced in 1873 with the 1 rin coin (with the 5 rin coin introduced in 1916), as until that time the rin had existed only as an accounting unit (10 rin = 1 sen). The most current coin, the Tenpō Tsūhō (天保通寶, a coin with a face value of 100 mon) was valued at only 8 rin (0.8 sen) in that sen period.

History

Toraisen, Shichūsen, and Bitasen 

Though the production of copper, silver, and gold coins had already started in the eighth century, they weren't often used as a medium for exchange until later when the Japanese started importing Chinese coins, which replaced the Japanese commodity currency economy. As internal trade grew due to agricultural and handicraft developments, the people started preferring coinage to barter, leading to a growth of demand for copper coins. The Southern Song dynasty prohibited the export of its coinage in 1179 due to its problem with the outflow of currency, but shiploads of Chinese coins would still enter Japan annually through Ningbo. There is evidence to suggest that the Yuan dynasty used to extensively export Chinese cash coins to Japan for local circulation.

Since the trade had begun with Japan, and they received payment in Chinese coins for Japanese goods, they stopped minting their own copper coinage until 1587. The Ashikaga shogunate imported Kōbu Tsūhō (洪武通寶), Eiraku Tsūhō (永樂通寳), and Katei Tsūhō (嘉靖通寶) from the Ming dynasty, which they referred to as Toraisen or Minsen, but the high demand for copper coinage inspired local and private production of copper coins (Shichūsen). An example of a Shichūsen used for trade with China and the Ryukyu Kingdom would be a Kōbu Tsūhō coin minted by Satsuma domain which included the character “” (Ji) on the reverse indicating that it was minted at the town of Kajiki, while still using the inscription of the Hongwu Emperor of Ming China. Some Shichūsen would also bear the inscriptions of coins from the Song dynasty, although it was not uncommon for many coins to simply be recasts and copies of older Song and Ming dynasty coins in the form of Iutsushi (鋳写し) or by simply adding extra carvings on existing circulating Chinese coins.

Bitasen refers to the Shichūsen coinage produced in Japan by the nobility and private local mints, and not by the imperial government or before the establishment of the Tokugawa shogunate which were often poor in appearance, as well as damaged and worn out imported Chinese coins.

Over time these coins would become damaged, and this made sellers more discriminating in what coins they would accept at face value, often accepting them only at ¼ of a good quality coin. Though Chinese coins would continue to circulate in Eastern Japan, the confusion and chaos caused by the Bitasen coinage caused rice to replace copper coinage in Western Japan. From 1608 onwards it was illegal to pay with Bitasen, and the shogunate opened more mines for the production of copper, silver, and gold coinages. Despite this, however, Bitasen continued to circulate within Japan, but from 1670 the Eiraku Tsūhō was completely prohibited from circulation and depreciated in favour of the Kan'ei Tsūhō.

Kan'ei Tsūhō 

In 1636, the Kan'ei Tsūhō (Kyūjitai: 寛永通寳 ; Shinjitai: 寛永通宝) coin was introduced by the government of the Tokugawa shogunate as a means to standardise copper coins and keep up a sufficient supply of copper coinage, being the first government minted copper coin in 700 years, despite this however they were introduced in the Mito domain 10 years prior during the 3rd year of the Kan'ei era. These coins would become the daily currency of the common people and would be used for small payments. Due to the isolationist policies of the Tokugawa shogunate, the outflow of currency halted and Kan'ei Tsūhō coins would continue to stay the main coin circulating in Japan. Kan'ei Tsūhō were minted for 230 years despite the fact that the Kan’ei era ended in 1643, and coins would continue to bear the Kan’ei legend, even when a new denomination of the coin was introduced a century later, though they weren't all uniform as the shogunate outsourced the mintage to regional and local merchants who would cast them at varying weights and sizes, as well as occasionally having local mint marks. By the 1650s 16 private mints were opened for the production of Kan'ei Tsūhō coins all over Japan. Kan'ei Tsūhō produced before 1688 are referred to as “old Kan’ei” and are recognisable by their similar calligraphic styles making them hard to differentiate from one another, meanwhile Kan'ei Tsūhō coins produced after 1688  (or “new Kan’ei” coins) tend to be more diverse in calligraphic styling, and the 4 mon denomination has waves on its reverse making it easily distinguishable from other coins.

From 1738 the government authorised the manufacture of iron Kan'ei Tsūhō 1 mon coins, and in 1866 (just before the end of the Edo period) iron 4 mon Kan'ei Tsūhō were authorised. While iron coins were being minted, the quality of copper coins would decrease due to frequent debasements.

Export 

As Bitasen coins were no longer allowed to circulate within Japan, Japanese traders started selling them on foreign markets for profits, especially on the Vietnamese market where a huge influx of Eiraku Tsūhō and Kan'ei Tsūhō coins from Japan made the Japanese mon the de facto currency of the region. The large export of Japanese coins to Vietnam during this period mostly happened on Red seal ships.

From 1633 the Tokugawa government adopted the isolationist Sakoku policy. The Shogunate, however, opened up the seaport of Nagasaki to export with the Dutch East India Company and Chinese merchant ships from Southeast Asia. The Japanese merchants who were now prohibited from exporting mon coins directly to Vietnam used the Dutch traders as middlemen and exported, between 1633 and 1637, around 105,835 strings of 960 Eiraku Tsūhō and Kan’ei Tsūhō coins (or 101,600,640 mon) to Vietnam. From 1659 this continued with the Nagasaki trade coins which were specifically minted for foreign markets; this is why they were escribed with Song dynasty inscriptions as coins from the Song dynasty were already circulating in Southeast Asia and the populace had already become accustomed to them. The trade of mon coins stopped however after the Shogunate banned the export of copper in 1715.

Inflation during the Bakumatsu 

In 1708 the Tokugawa shogunate introduced the Hōei Tsūhō (Kyūjitai: 寳永通寳 ; Shinjitai: 宝永通宝) which had a face value of 10 mon (but contained 3 times as much copper as a 1 mon Kan’ei Tsūhō coin), which lead to the coin being discontinued very shortly after it started circulating as it wasn't accepted for its nominal value.

However, in 1835 (during the Bakumatsu) the Tokugawa shogunate tried issuing a larger denomination copper coin again with the Tenpō Tsūhō 100 mon coin which this time only contained five and a half times the amount of copper in a 1 mon coin, but was accepted nonetheless. The introduction of this denomination caused large scale inflation comparable to that of caused by the 100 wén coin minted by the Qing dynasty  in 1853, or the 100 mun coin issued by the Kingdom of Joseon in 1866. The reason for the change in mentality was the scarcity of copper which had earlier forced the Japanese to mint iron coins breaking the previously established tri-metallic system. The concurrent circulation of 1, 4, and (heavily debased) 100 mon coins caused for a chaotic reaction from the market, as did widespread circulation of forged coinage.

Another major cause for inflation was that from 1859 local Daimyō started minting their own coinage often with high denominations to increase the money supply or to get more gold and silver for their low copper supplies. In 1862 this inspired Daimyō Shimazu Nariakira to produce Tenpō Tsūhō derivatives in the form of 100 on Ryūkyū Tsūhō coins and even ½ Shu Ryūkyū Tsūhō coins under the pretence of minting coins for their vassal Ryukyu Kingdom, this proved profitable for the Satsuma domain.

Stringing of coins  
 

Mon coins were holed, allowing them to be strung together on a piece of string. 
In the Edo period of Japan (1615-1868), stringed together coins received a small discount when presented like this. For example, for 100 Mon payment: if those 1 Mon coins were all tied in a row, discount given was 4 mon, so 96 stringed coins of 1 mon were accepted at par with 100 mon. Similar discounts existed probably for other bulk payments with small coinage in stringed form.

List of Japanese mon coins 

During the history of the Japanese mon, many coins with different inscriptions were cast. The main coins cast by the central government were:

Many Japanese domains produced their own currency, which happened chaotically, so that the nation's money supply expanded by 2.5 times between 1859 and 1869, leading to crumbling money values and soaring prices.

These coins were often produced with the name of the domain or province on them. The mon coins produced by domains are:

See also 

 Wadōkaichin
 Economy of Japan
 Japanese numismatic charm

Currencies with the same etymology 
 Chinese wen
 Korean mun
 Vietnamese văn
 Ryukyuan mon

Notes

References

Further reading 
 Titsingh, Isaac. (1834). [Siyun-sai Rin-siyo/Hayashi Gahō, 1652]. Nipon o daï itsi ran; ou, Annales des empereurs du Japon.] Paris: Oriental Translation Fund of Great Britain and Ireland.  ... Click for digitized, full-text copy of this book (in French).
 David Hartill (2011). Early Japanese Coins. New Generation Publishing. 

Ancient currencies
Medieval currencies
Modern obsolete currencies
Coins of Japan 
Cash coins 

ja:文 (通貨単位)